Saibankoppa is a village in Dharwad district of Karnataka, India.

Demographics 
As of the 2011 Census of India there were 30 households in Saibankoppa and a total population of 110 consisting of 59 males and 51 females. There were 15 children ages 0-6.

References

Villages in Dharwad district